TACSOP is an acronym commonly used by the U.S. military for TACtical Standing Operating Procedure. The TACSOP is essentially the "game-plan" that units follow when conducting tactical operations. Similar to sports team and "secret" plays, most units have a pre-determined default method for initiating attacks and solutions to problems that could arise.

Battle drills
The different ways to attack the enemy or possibly be attacked are called battle drills. The TACSOP includes plans such as
MEDEVAC - MEDical EVACuation
FRAGO - FRAGmentary Order
WARNO - WARNing Order
OPORD - OPerations ORDer

Indexing
TACSOPs are organized into the following format:
Annex A: Task Organization
Annex B: Command and Control
Annex C: Operations
Annex D: NBC
Annex E: Air Defense Artillery
Annex F: Fire Support
Annex G: Fire Control and Distribution
Annex H: Operational Security
Annex I: Combat Service Support
Annex J: Signal
Annex K: Intelligence
Annex L: Safety
Annex L: LDP

External links
Dennis J. Reimer Training and Doctrine Digital Library

Military terminology of the United States